The Masters of the Universe Role Playing Game is a role-playing game published by FASA in 1985.

Description
The Masters of the Universe Role Playing Game is a fantasy system based on the He-Man and the Masters of the Universe cartoon series. It consists of a boardgame with simple role-playing with player characters such as He-Man, Teela, and Orko pitted against Skeletor and the forces of evil. The rules are presented in comic-book style by staff artists from First Comics. The set includes cardstock character cards, miniatures, and components.

Publication history
The Masters of the Universe Role Playing Game was designed by Ross Babcock with Jack C. Harris, with illustrations by Hilary Barta, Doug Rice, Willie Schubert, and Rick Taylor, and was published by FASA in 1985 as a boxed set including a 24-page book, a color board, two cardstock sheets, and dice.

The game was rushed out to the printers half-finished to release it to market before the show was cancelled. Most of the rules were unclear or absent, but were supposed to be sent in an expanded edition later on.

Reception
Daniel Mackay, in his book The Fantasy Role-Playing Game: A New Performing Art, notes this game as an example of an unsuccessful licensed role-playing game.

References

Fantasy role-playing games
FASA games
Masters of the Universe
Role-playing games based on television series
Role-playing games introduced in 1985
Science fantasy role-playing games